Ida Gørtz Jacobsen (born 1 March 1995) is a Danish rower.

Jacobsen won a medal at the 2019 World Rowing Championships. She was part of the Cambridge boat that won the 2019 boat race beating Oxford by 5 lengths.

She represented Denmark at the 2020 Summer Olympics in Tokyo.

References

External links

1995 births
Living people
Danish female rowers
World Rowing Championships medalists for Denmark
Rowers at the 2020 Summer Olympics
Olympic rowers of Denmark